Noya  is a department of Estuaire Province in western Gabon. The capital lies at Cocobeach. It had a population of 4,225 in 2013.

Towns and villages
The village Milembié is at 40 km to Cocobeach when coming from Libreville

References

Estuaire Province
Departments of Gabon